Lemer Public School is an English medium school in Thriprayar, one of the villages of Thrissur district in Kerala.

References 

Schools in Thrissur district
Educational institutions established in 2005
2005 establishments in Kerala